Málaga María Zambrano railway station (Spanish: Málaga María Zambrano) is the principal railway station in the city Málaga in Andalusia, Spain on the Córdoba-Málaga high-speed rail line. It is served by high-speed trains to Madrid, Barcelona as well as the Cercanías Málaga and Málaga Metro systems.

In 2017 the station served 6.1 million passengers, of which a million used Cercanías Málaga commuter services. It is named after María Zambrano, a Spanish philosopher.

Layout

Málaga María Zambrano contains twelve platforms, of which two are underground and exclusively used by Cercanías Málaga, which continue into the city centre to Málaga Centro-Alameda railway station. There are eleven tracks available in the station of which five are of standard gauge and used by AVE services. The Málaga Metro's El Perchel station is located outside María Zambrano station.

Facilities
Designed as a public private partnership, Málaga María Zambrano operates as a Vialia shopping mall containing various retail outlets including Mercadona, MediaMarkt and H&M. It is estimated that up to 50% of the customers of these outlets are not rail passengers.

Services

References

Railway stations in Andalusia
Buildings and structures in Málaga